Richard D. James is an English musician who has recorded songs since 1991. Over the course of his career, he has released songs under many aliases, his most well-known being Aphex Twin. James has also released music under the pseudonyms, AFX, Polygon Window, Analogue Bubblebath, Dice Man, GAK, Caustic Window, Power-Pill, Bradley Strider, The Tuss, Mike & Rich (with Mike Paradinas), and Universal Indicator (with Mike Dred).

All songs written and produced by Richard D. James, except where noted.

Notes

References

James, Richard D.